Simone Nieweg (born 1962) is a German photographer, living in Düsseldorf, who photographs agricultural landscapes in rural Germany.

She has had solo exhibitions at The National Museum of Photography, Film & Television in Bradford, UK and at Kunsthalle Bielefeld, Bielefeld, Germany. Nieweg's work is held in the collections of the Contemporary Art Museum St. Louis, Huis Marseille, Museum for Photography, the Museum of Modern Art in New York, Saint Louis Art Museum, San Francisco Museum of Modern Art and the Victoria and Albert Museum.

Life and work
Nieweg was born in Bielefeld, Ostwestfalen-Lippe, North Rhine-Westphalia, Germany.

She attended the Kunstakademie Düsseldorf between 1984 and 1990, where she studied under Bernd Becher. She uses a large format camera.

Between 1986 and 2012, Nieweg explored "the German tradition of "Grabeland," a unique community gardening system practiced on the outskirts of urban centers." She "photographed the agricultural landscape found on the outskirts of towns and industrial areas in the Rühr and Lower Rhine. Plots of unused land, leased out for one year, are transformed into richly planted allotments, after which they are ploughed and left unseeded." Because of the temporary nature of the lease, tenants do not build permanent huts and stable sheds, as is usual in allotment gardens, but use meagre means to assemble small, wobbly sheds for equipment. "Nieweg photographs subjects such as gates, fields and allotments. All show individuality, reflecting the personality of their owners: sheds held together with wire and corrugated iron tacked haphazardly to wooden frames; rickety structures, that, despite their impermanence, have been carefully built." This work was published in the books Felder und Gärten (1996), Grabeland (2001), Landschaften und Gartenstücke (2002), and Nature Man-Made (2012).

Publications

Books of work by Nieweg
Felder und Gärten. , Münster, 1996, . With a text by Volker Kahmen.
Grabeland. Bonn: Rheinisches Landesmuseum Bonn, 2001. With a text by Christoph Schaden.
Landschaften und Gartenstücke.. Munich: Schirmer/Mosel, 2002. . With texts by Els Barents, Saskia Asser and Andrea Domelse.
Natur der Menschen. Munich: Schirmer/Mosel, 2012. With a text by Heinz Liesbrock.
Nature Man-Made. Munich: Schirmer/Mosel, 2012. .
Der Wald, Die Bäume, Das Licht: Photographien. Munich: Schirmer/Mosel, 2016. .

Publications with contributions by Nieweg
Art Photography Now. New York: Aperture, 2005. By Susan Bright. . 
The Düsseldorf School of Photography. New York: Aperture, 2010. Germany: Schirmer/Mosel, 2010. Edited by Stefan Gronert. Includes work by Bernd and Hilla Becher, Laurenz Berges, Elger Esser, Andreas Gursky, Candida Höfer, Axel Hütte, Nieweg, Thomas Ruff, Jörg Sasse, Thomas Struth, and Petra Wunderlich; a foreword by Lothar Schirmer, an essay by Gronert, and summary biographies, exhibition lists and bibliographies for each of the photographers. .

Collections
Nieweg's work is held in the following public collections:
Contemporary Art Museum St. Louis, St. Louis, Missouri
Huis Marseille, Museum for Photography, Amsterdam: 8 prints (as of December 2020)
Museum of Modern Art, New York: 6 prints (as of December 2020)
Saint Louis Art Museum, St. Louis, Missouri
San Francisco Museum of Modern Art, San Francisco, California: 5 prints (as of December 2020)
Victoria and Albert Museum, London: 3 prints (as of December 2020)

Solo exhibitions
Landscapes and Gardens, The National Museum of Photography, Film & Television, Bradford, UK, 2004
Natur der Menschen = nature man-made, Bottrop, Germany, 2012
Gärten/Felder = gardens/fields, Kunsthalle Bielefeld, Bielefeld, Germany, 2012

References

External links
Nieweg at Gallery Luisotti

Landscape photographers
German women photographers
20th-century German photographers
21st-century German photographers
Kunstakademie Düsseldorf alumni
People from Bielefeld
Living people
1962 births
20th-century German women
21st-century German women